Biodiversity offsetting is a system used predominantly by  planning authorities and developers to fully compensate for biodiversity impacts associated with economic development, through the  planning process. In some circumstances, biodiversity offsets are designed to result in an overall biodiversity gain. Offsetting is generally considered the final stage in a mitigation hierarchy, whereby predicted biodiversity impacts must first be avoided, minimised and reversed by developers, before any remaining impacts are offset. The mitigation hierarchy serves to meet the environmental policy principle of "No Net Loss" of biodiversity alongside development.

Individuals or companies involved in arranging biodiversity offsets will use quantitative measures to determine the amount, type and quality of habitat that is likely to be affected by a proposed project. Then, they will establish a new location or locations (often called receptor sites) where it would be possible to re-create the same amount, type and quality of habitat. The aim of biodiversity offsets is not simply to provide financial compensation for the biodiversity losses associated with development, although developers might pay financial compensation in some cases if it can be demonstrated exactly what the physical biodiversity gains achieved by that compensation will be. The type of environmental compensation provided by biodiversity offsetting is different from biodiversity banking in that it must show both measurable and long-term biodiversity improvements, that can be demonstrated to counteract losses. However, there is so far mixed evidence that biodiversity offsets successfully counteract the biodiversity losses caused by associated developments, with no evidence that offsets have yet successfully compensated for the loss of forested habitats, and evidence that offsets have sometimes successfully achieved no net loss of biodiversity in wetland habitats.

Relevant conservation activities 

Biodiversity offset projects can involve various management activities that can be demonstrated to deliver gains in biodiversity. These activities very often include active habitat restoration or creation projects (e.g. new wetland creation, grassland restoration). However, also viable are so-called "averted loss" biodiversity offsets, in which measures are taken to prevent ecological degradation from occurring where it almost certainly would have happened otherwise. Averted loss offsets might involve the creation of new protected areas (to conserve fauna species that would otherwise have disappeared), the removal of invasive species from areas of habitat (which otherwise would have reduced or displaced populations of native species), or positive measures to reduce extensive natural resource use (e.g. the offer of alternative livelihood creation to prevent activities leading to deforestation).

Any activities that do not result in a positive and measurable gain for biodiversity would not generally be counted as part of a biodiversity offset. For instance, if a developer funds ecological conservation research in a region that they are impacting through a project, would not count as an offset (unless it could be shown quantitatively how specific fauna and flora would benefit). instead, this would be a more general form of compensation. Note that biodiversity offsets can be considered a very specific, robust and transparent category of ecological compensation.

Receptor sites 

Under many offset systems, receptor sites are areas of land put forward by companies or individuals looking to receive payment in return for creating (or restoring) biodiversity habitats on their property. The biodiversity restoration projects are financed by compensation from developers looking to offset their biodiversity impact. The resulting change in biodiversity levels at the new receptor sites should be equal to, or greater than, the losses at the original ‘impact site’; in order to achieve no  net loss – and preferably gain – of overall biodiversity. Such systems often rely on the buying (by developers) and selling (by landowners) of  conservation credits.

However, characteristics of receptor sites can vary across different jurisdictions. In some countries, for instance, land is primarily state-owned, and so it is the government that owns and manages biodiversity offset projects. For biodiversity offsets in marine environments, receptor sites might be subject to multiple management organisations and not necessarily owned by anyone. Controversially, some biodiversity offsets use existing protected areas as receptor sites (i.e. improving the effectiveness of areas that are already managed for biodiversity conservation).

Requirement to offset biodiversity 

Biodiversity offsets are required by law in many jurisdictions.

Countries including the US, Australia, New Zealand, UK and parts of Europe use biodiversity offsetting as an optional or mandatory (depending on the country) biodiversity conservation management tool within their planning systems.

Biodiversity offsetting is also being considered by some Latin American countries (Colombia, Peru, Ecuador and Chile) and by South Africa.

Another key driver of biodiversity offset projects globally are the Performance Standards required by the International Finance Corporation (IFC). For any projects which the IFC or any of the Equator Banks finance, under Performance Standard 6, developers must deliver No Net Loss (or in some cases, a Net Gain) of biodiversity.

Finally, a number of companies implement biodiversity offsets after setting voluntary policy commitments to achieve 'no net loss' or a 'net positive impact' for biodiversity overall associated with their operations. This is part of a broader effort for the private sector to manage biodiversity.

Compensatory mitigation in the US 

No Net Loss policy (and consequently, biodiversity offsetting) has its origin in US legislation, specifically in the Water Act from the 1970s. This piece of legislation required 'no net loss of wetland acreage and function', leading eventually to the creation of mitigation banks, where wetland credits are bought and sold.

The US also has a Conservation Banking policy in which credits representing areas of habitat for protected fauna species are traded.

In the US, offsetting tends to be called 'compensatory mitigation'.

Offsetting in Australia 

Much of the scientific research into biodiversity offsetting outside of the US has been conducted by Australia, especially organisations such as CEED and CSIRO.

Biodiversity offset policies have become established in a number of Australian states (especially Victoria and New South Wales), and there is also a federal biodiversity offset policy. States tend to operate biodiversity banking mechanisms at the regional level. Major species include koalas, the red‐tailed black‐cockatoo, and the green and golden bell frog which required 19 times more habitat to achieve no net loss.

Offsetting in the UK 

In the UK, compensation (for environmental harm caused by development) in the form of biodiversity offsetting is currently an optional (non-compulsory) tool for developers unless compensation is legally required for impacts to protected sites or species. In England, biodiversity net gain is encouraged by planning policy.
Those developers choosing to incorporate biodiversity offsetting practices into their project plans can do so once the normal planning mitigation hierarchy  has been followed, which involves taking steps to avoid and reduce environmental harm, where possible, at the development, or 'impact', site.

Biodiversity offsetting is only applicable to land that has been approved for development, which means it does not often apply to protected sites such as  Sites of Special Scientific Interest (SSSIs) or  national nature reserves (NNRs). In addition to protected areas, vulnerable or irreplaceable habitats (such as ancient woodland) are also sometimes exempted from local policies for biodiversity offsetting.

In 2011, six biodiversity offsetting  pilot schemes were started in England by the  British Government to test the process. They were run in partnership with local groups and private companies and are located in Warwickshire, Essex, the Ribble Valley, at three sites in Devon, in Nottinghamshire. and Doncaster.

In September 2013, the British Government published a Green Paper containing plans for further incorporation of biodiversity offsetting in the UK planning system. (Public consultation period: 5 September – 7 November 2013).

In March 2019, the British Government announced that it will mandate biodiversity net gain in England as part of its forthcoming Environment Bill, requiring 'developers to ensure habitats for wildlife are enhanced and left in a measurably better state than they were pre-development.'

Economic value 

Biodiversity is increasingly seen as having economic value due to  growing recognition of the world's finite natural resources and through the benefits of ecosystem services (nature providing clean air, food and water, natural flood defences, pollination services and recreation opportunity). Placing financial value on biodiversity has created a marketplace for retaining and restoring habitats.

Financial gain from biodiversity offsetting is brought about through the sale of  conservation credits by landowners. Individuals or companies who are looking to receive financial payment in return for creating or enhancing particular wildlife habitats on their property can have their land valued in conservation credits by a biodiversity offsetting broker  who will then register their credits for sale  to developers looking to offset any residual impact to biodiversity from their approved developments.

Developers can also find the business of biodiversity offsetting appealing financially as the compensation payment for their project's residual biodiversity impact is handled in one agreement and the landowner receiving that payment (and therefore the habitat re-creation duties) is responsible for the biodiversity restoration and management thereafter. The cost may represent a small proportion of a developer's budget and is often outweighed by a project's long-term gains. As corporate social responsibility is often part of larger companies’ business priorities, being able to demonstrate environmentally responsible practices can be an additional incentive.

Biodiversity offsetting based upon showing the economic value of lost habitat is highly controversial. The schemes proposed for the UK have been regarded as failing to protect biodiversity and indeed leading to further losses in the prioritisation of development over conservation. The basic economics has been described by ecological economist Clive Spash as leading to the “bulldozing of biodiversity” under an approach that regards optimal species extinction as being necessary to achieve economic efficiency.

Conservation credits 

The cost of re-creating an area of habitat affected by a development proposal (impact site) can be calculated and represented as a number of conservation credits that a developer could purchase in order to offset their biodiversity impact. Land put forward for investment to re-create impacted biodiversity (receptor site) is also calculated in conservation credits (to account for the cost of creating or restoring biodiversity at that particular site and to cover the cost of its long-term conservation management). This situation enables the buying (by developers) and selling (by landowners) of conservation credits. Government approved (quantitative and qualitative) metrics should be used to calculate the number of conservation credits that can be applied to each site, in order to maintain accuracy and consistency in the value of a conservation credit.

Motivation 

A decline in global biodiversity  due, in part, to land use changes  is the motivation for creating a system within the planning process that tackles unavoidable and residual impact to biodiversity.
Formal evaluation of impact to habitat, wildlife and other natural considerations is often required of developers ahead of receiving  approval for a project to go ahead. This can often be in the form of  Environmental Impact Assessments (EIA), which are commonplace within the work of Government planning authorities. EIAs look at how proposed projects may impact upon the environment in its broadest sense, covering the traditional ‘green’ aspects alongside any social and economic issues; and can result in mitigating and compensatory packages which form part of a project's overall proposal for approval. The topic of biodiversity is likely to be looked at as part of an EIA, but in conjunction with many other overriding elements.
Biodiversity offsetting, as an assessment and compensatory process, can either sit inside or outside of EIA and aims, specifically, to tackle habitat – and therefore biodiversity – loss.

See also 

 Biodiversity
 Biodiversity banking
 Cross-sector biodiversity initiative
 Economics of biodiversity
 Ecosystem services
 Mitigation banking
 No net loss

References

Further reading 
 "Business and Biodiversity Offsets Programme"
  Conservation when nothing stands still: moving targets and biodiversity offsets; Joseph Bull, Kenwyn B Suttle, Navinder J Singh, EJ Milner-Gulland – Imperial College London, Swedish University of Agricultural Sciences
  Defra Biodiversity Offsetting Pilots: guidance for developers
  Exploring the potential demand for and supply of habitat banking in the EU and appropriate design elements for a habitat banking scheme
  Realising nature's value: the final report of the Ecosystem Markets Task Force (March 2013)
  Builders: The saviours of meadows? Sunday Telegraph, 25 Oct 2013

External links 
 Biodiversity offsetting in the UK
 Economic and environmental opportunities in Europe
  UK Biodiversity offsetting brokers: The Environment Bank
  Biodiversity offsetting in Australia
 Biodiversity offsets programme in New Zealand
 Latin American biodiversity offsetting

Biodiversity